The 2020 Milwaukee Brewers season was the 51st season for the Brewers in Milwaukee, the 23rd in the National League, and 52nd overall. The Brewers finished the regular season 29-31 and clinched the eighth seed in the postseason, becoming the first National League team to clinch the playoffs with a losing record. This marked the first time in franchise history where the Brewers clinched a playoff berth in three consecutive years, starting with the 2018 season.

On March 12, 2020, MLB announced that because of the ongoing COVID-19 pandemic, the start of the regular season would be delayed by at least two weeks in addition to the remainder of spring training being cancelled. Four days later, it was announced that the start of the season would be pushed back indefinitely due to the recommendation made by the CDC to restrict events of more than 50 people for eight weeks. On June 23, commissioner Rob Manfred unilaterally implemented a 60-game season. Players reported to training camps on July 1 in order to resume spring training and prepare for a July 24 Opening Day. The Brewers lost to the Los Angeles Dodgers in two games in the 2020 National League Wild Card Series.

Spring training
The Brewers finished spring training with a record of 10–7 (2 ties). They also had 15 games canceled, 3 due to rain, and 12 due to the COVID-19 pandemic. Spring training was limited due to the COVID-19 pandemic. Upon returning to play in July 2020, the team played intra-squad scrimmages instead of playing a full complement of spring training games. The team flew by charter planes to their scrimmages. On July 22, they defeated the Chicago White Sox, in their only exhibition game during the restart, 5–3.

Opening Day Starters

Season standings

National League Central

National League Wild Card

Record vs. opponents

Game log

Regular season

|-style=background:#fcc
| 1 || July 24 || @ Cubs || 0–3 || Woodruff (0–1) || Hendricks (1–0) || — || 0–1 || L1
|-style=background:#cfc
| 2 || July 25 || @ Cubs || 8–3 || Darvish (0–1) || Suter (1–0) || — || 1–1 || W1
|-style=background:#fcc
| 3 || July 26 || @ Cubs || 1–9 || Peralta (0–1) || Chatwood (1–0) || — || 1–2 || L1
|-style=background:#cfc
| 4 || July 27 || @ Pirates || 6–5  || Neverauskas (0–1) || Phelps (1–0) || — || 2–2 || W1
|-style=background:#fcc
| 5 || July 28 || @ Pirates || 6–8 || Wahl (0–1) || Hartlieb (1–0) || Burdi (1) || 2–3 || L1
|-style=background:#cfc
| 6 || July 29 || @ Pirates || 3–0 || Musgrove (0–2) || Woodruff (1–1) || Hader (1) || 3–3 || W1
|-style=background:#bbb
| — || July 31 || Cardinals || colspan="6"|Postponed (COVID-19); Makeup: September 14 
|-

|-style=background:#bbb
| — || August 1 || Cardinals || colspan="6"|Postponed (COVID-19); Makeup: September 16 
|-style=background:#bbb
| — || August 2 || Cardinals || colspan="6"|Postponed (COVID-19); Makeup: September 25 
|-style=background:#fcc
| 7 || August 3 || White Sox || 4–6 || Phelps (1–1) || Detwiler (1–0) || Colomé (2) || 3–4 || L1
|-style=background:#fcc
| 8 || August 4 || White Sox || 2–3 || Williams (0–1) || Giolito (1–1) || Colomé (3) || 3–5 || L2
|-style=background:#cfc
| 9 || August 5 || @ White Sox || 1–0 || Keuchel (2–1) || Houser (1–0) || Hader (2) || 4–5 || W1
|-style=background:#cfc
| 10 || August 6 || @ White Sox || 8–3 || González (0–1) || Lindblom (1–0) || — || 5–5 || W2
|-style=background:#fcc
| 11 || August 7 || Reds || 3–8 || Lauer (0–1) || Bauer (2–0) || — || 5–6 || L1
|-style=background:#fcc
| 12 || August 8 || Reds || 1–4 || Anderson (0–1) || DeSclafani (1–0) || Iglesias (2) || 5–7 || L2
|-style=background:#cfc
| 13 || August 9 || Reds || 9–3 || Gray (3–1) || Suter (2–0) || — || 6–7 || W1
|-style=background:#fcc
| 14 || August 10 || Twins || 2–4 || Houser (1–1) || Dobnak (3–1) || Rogers (4) || 6–8 || L1
|-style=background:#cfc
| 15 || August 11 || Twins || 6–4 || Rogers (1–2) || Williams (1–1) || Hader (3) || 7–8 || W1
|-style=background:#fcc
| 16 || August 12 || Twins || 2–12 || Lauer (0–2) || Maeda (3–0) || — || 7–9 || L1
|-style=background:#fcc
| 17 || August 13 || @ Cubs || 2–4 || Anderson (0–2) || Darvish (3–1) || Wick (3) || 7–10 || L2
|-style=background:#cfc
| 18 || August 14 || @ Cubs || 4–3 || Mills (2–1) || Peralta (1–1) || Hader (4) || 8–10 || W1
|-style=background:#cfc
| 19 || August 15 || @ Cubs || 6–5  || Jeffress (1–1) || Phelps (2–1) || Claudio (1) ||  9–10 || W2
|-style=background:#cfc
| 20 || August 16 || @ Cubs || 6–5 || Adam (0–1) || Yardley (1–0) || Hader (5) || 10–10 || W3
|-style=background:#fcc
| 21 || August 18 || @ Twins || 3–4  || Phelps (2–2) || Alcalá (1–0) || — || 10–11 || L1
|-style=background:#cfc
| 22 || August 19 || @ Twins || 9–3 || Hill (1–1) || Anderson (1–2) || — || 11–11 || W1
|-style=background:#fcc
| 23 || August 20 || @ Twins || 1–7 || Woodruff (1–2) || Berríos (2–3) || — || 11–12 || L1
|-style=background:#fcc
| 24 || August 21 || @ Pirates || 2–7 || Houser (1–2) || Kuhl (1–1) || — || 11–13 || L2
|-style=background:#fcc
| 25 || August 22 || @ Pirates || 5–12 || Lindblom (1–1) || Holland (1–1) || — || 11–14 || L3
|-style=background:#fcc
| 26 || August 23 || @ Pirates || 4–5 || Phelps (2–3) || Stratton (1–0) || Rodríguez (1) || 11–15 || L4
|-style=background:#cfc
| 27 || August 24 || Reds || 4–2 || Bauer (3–1) || Anderson (2–2) || Hader (6)  || 12–15 || W1
|-style=background:#cfc
| 28 || August 25 || Reds || 3–2 || Castillo (0–4) || Woodruff (2–2) || Hader (7) || 13–15 || W2
|-style="background:#bbb
| — || August 26 || Reds || colspan=7 | Postponed (Boycotts due to Jacob Blake shooting); Makeup: August 27
|-style=background:#fcc
| 29 || August 27  || Reds || 1–6 || Houser (1–3) || Gray (5–1) || – || 13–16 || L1
|-style=background:#fcc
| 30 || August 27  || Reds || 0–6 || Lindblom (1–2) || Sims (2–0) || – || 13–17 || L2
|-style=background:#cfc
| 31 || August 28 || Pirates || 9–1 || Holland (1–2) || Burnes (1–0) || — || 14–17 || W1
|-style=background:#cfc
| 32 || August 29 || Pirates || 7–6 || Rodríguez (0–2) || Williams (2–1) || – || 15–17 || W2
|-style=background:#fcc
| 33 || August 30 || Pirates || 1–5 || Woodruff (2–3) || Tropeano (1–0) || — || 15–18 || L1
|-style=background:#cfc
| 34 || August 31 || Pirates || 6–5 || Turley (0–1) || Williams (3–1) || Hader (8) || 16–18 || W1
|-

|-style=background:#fcc
| 35 || September 1 || Tigers || 1–12 || Lindblom (1–3) || Norris (3–1) || — || 16–19 || L1
|-style=background:#cfc
| 36 || September 2 || Tigers || 8–5 || Jiménez (1–2) || Yardley (2–0) || Hader (9)  || 17–19 || W1
|-style=background:#cfc
| 37 || September 4 || @ Indians || 7–1 || Maton (2–1) || Burnes (2–0) || — || 18–19 || W2
|-style=background:#fcc
| 38 || September 5 || @ Indians || 3–4 || Hader (0–1) || Hand (1–1) || — || 18–20 || L1
|-style=background:#fcc
| 39 || September 6 || @ Indians || 1–4 || Anderson (2–3) || Bieber (7–0) || Hand (11) || 18–21 || L2
|-style=background:#fcc
| 40 || September 8 || @ Tigers || 3–8 || Houser (1–4) || Turnbull (4–2) || — || 18–22 || L3
|-style=background:#cfc
| 41 || September 9 || @ Tigers || 19–0 || Boyd (1–6) || Burnes (3–0) || — || 19–22 || W1
|-style=background:#cfc
| 42 || September 11 || Cubs || 1–0 || Wick (0–1) || Hader (1–1) || — || 20–22 || W2
|-style=background:#fcc
| 43 || September 12 || Cubs || 2–4 || Hader (1–2) || Adam (1–1) || Kimbrel (2) || 20–23 || L1
|-style=background:#fcc
| 44 || September 13 || Cubs || 0–12 || Houser (1–5) || Mills (5–3) || — || 20–24 || L2
|-style=background:#cfc
| 45 || September 14  || Cardinals || 2–1  || Helsley (1–1) || Peralta (2–1) || — || 21–24 || W1
|-style=background:#fcc
| 46 || September 14  || Cardinals || 2–3  || Topa (0–1) || Cabrera (4–1) || Webb (1) || 21–25 || L1
|-style=background:#cfc
| 47 || September 15 || Cardinals || 18–3 || Flaherty (3–2) || Anderson (3–3) || — || 22–25 || W1
|-style=background:#fcc
| 48 || September 16  || Cardinals || 2–4  || Woodruff (2–4) || Wainwright (5–1) || — || 22–26 || L1
|-style=background:#cfc
| 49 || September 16  || Cardinals || 6–0  || Oviedo (0–3) || Peralta (3–1) || — || 23–26 || W1
|-style=background:#cfc
| 50 || September 18 || Royals || 9–5 || Duffy (3–4) || Rasmussen (1–0) || — || 24–26 || W2
|-style=background:#cfc
| 51 || September 19 || Royals || 5–0 || Bubic (1–6) || Burnes (4–0) || — || 25–26 || W3
|-style=background:#cfc
| 52 || September 20 || Royals || 5–3 || Keller (4–3) || Lindblom (2–3) || Hader (10) || 26–26 || W4
|-style=background:#fcc
| 53 || September 21 || @ Reds || 3–6 || Woodruff (2–5) || Castillo (4–5) || — || 26–27 || L1
|-style=background:#cfc
| 54 || September 22 || @ Reds || 3–2 || Antone (0–3) || Anderson (4–3) || Hader (11) || 27–27 || W1
|-style=background:#fcc
| 55 || September 23 || @ Reds || 1–6 || Houser (1–6) || Bauer (5–4) || — || 27–28 || L1
|-style=background:#fcc
| 56 || September 24 || @ Cardinals || 2–4 || Burnes (4–1) || Kim (3–0) || Miller (4) || 27–29 || L2
|-style="background:#cfc
| 57 || September 25  || @ Cardinals || 3–0  || Flaherty (4–3) || Williams (4–1) || Hader (12) || 28–29 || W1
|-style=background:#fcc
| 58 || September 25  || Cardinals || 1–9  || Lindblom (2–4) || Ponce de Leon (1–3) || — || 28–30 || L1
|-style=background:#cfc
| 59 || September 26 || @ Cardinals || 3–0 || Wainwright (5–3) || Woodruff (3–5) || Hader (13) || 29–30 || W1
|-style=background:#fcc
| 60 || September 27 || @ Cardinals || 2–5 || Anderson (4–4) || Gallegos (2–2) || Reyes (1) || 29–31 || L1
|-

|- style="text-align:center;"
| Legend:       = Win       = Loss       = PostponementBold = Brewers team member

Postseason Game log

|- style="background:#fcc
| 1 || September 30 || @ Dodgers || 2–4 || Suter (0–1) || Urías (1–0) || Jansen (1) || 0–1 || L1
|- style="background:#fcc
| 2 || October 1 || @ Dodgers || 0–3 || Woodruff (0–1) || Kershaw (1–0) || Graterol (1) || 0–2 || L2
|-

Postseason rosters

| style="text-align:left" |
Pitchers: 29 Josh Lindblom 35 Brent Suter 37 Adrian Houser 43 Drew Rasmussen 46 Corey Knebel 50 Ray Black 51 Freddy Peralta 53 Brandon Woodruff 56 Justin Topa 57 Eric Yardley 58 Alex Claudio 71 Josh Hader 
Catchers: 9 Manny Piña 10 Omar Narváez 20 David Freitas 
Infielders: 2 Luis Urías 3 Orlando Arcia 5 Jedd Gyorko 7 Eric Sogard 18 Keston Hiura 20 Daniel Vogelbach 28 Ryon Healy 
Outfielders: 8 Ryan Braun 14 Jace Peterson 15 Tyrone Taylor 16 Ben Gamel 22 Christian Yelich 24 Avisaíl García 
|- valign="top"

Roster

Statistics

Regular season

Batting 
Note: G = Games played; AB = At bats; R = Runs; H = Hits; 2B = Doubles; 3B = Triples; HR = Home runs; RBI = Runs batted in; SB = Stolen bases; BB = Walks; K = Strikeouts; AVG = Batting average; OBP = On base percentage; SLG = Slugging percentage; TB = Total bases

Source

Pitching 
Note: W = Wins; L = Losses; ERA = Earned run average; G = Games pitched; GS = Games started; SV = Saves; IP = Innings pitched; H = Hits allowed; R = Runs allowed; ER = Earned runs allowed; BB = Walks allowed; K = Strikeouts

Source

Farm system

The Brewers' farm system consisted of nine minor league affiliates in 2020. The minor league season, however, was cancelled due to the COVID-19 pandemic. Milwaukee planned to operate a Dominican Summer League team as a co-op with the Toronto Blue Jays.

Milwaukee Brewers monetary losses
A report in the Milwaukee Business Journal has estimated that the Milwaukee Brewers lost $178.3 million revenue as a result of having no fans. For 2020, Team Marketing Report has calculated $5 billion in losses for Major League Baseball.

References

External links
2020 Milwaukee Brewers season at Baseball Reference
Milwaukee Brewers season Official Site 

Milwaukee Brewers seasons
Milwaukee Brewers
Milwaukee Brewers